Eugene Katchalov (born February 21, 1981 in Kyiv, Ukraine) is an American professional poker player raised in Brooklyn, New York since age 10. He currently ranks #403 on the Global poker index, and has been ranked as high as number two. He is also 1st on the All-Time Money List in Ukraine.

Katchalov, a graduate with a business degree from NYU, is the winner of the largest payout for a non-championship event in the World Poker Tour (WPT), earning $2,482,605 with a win at the 2007 Doyle Brunson Five Diamond World Poker Classic.

In late 2016 Katchalov and poker player, and friend, Luca Pagano, entered the world of eSports with an Italian team: QLASH is the first professional team to attend the American spot of Dreamhack.

Poker
Katchalov has been playing poker professionally since 2003; in March 2011 he joined Team PokerStars Pro  and played under the screen name E.Katchalov. Katchalov was previously well known online under his former non-Team PokerStars Pro screen name MyRabbiFoo.
After five years under the red spade brand, they parted away  .

In addition to his 2007 WPT win, Katchalov finished 9th in the 2009 WPT Championship event.  He has cashed nine times on the WPT Tour for a total of $2,759,761.

Katchalov has had 30 cashes in World Series of Poker events, including a bracelet win in the 2011 $1,500 Seven-Card Stud Tournament.  He also finished 39th at the 2009 WSOP Main Event.

Katchalov has also succeeded on the European Poker Tour.  He has cashed nine times in Main Events including third-place finishes in London, 2009, and Barcelona, 2011 and a second-place finish in Deauville, 2014.  At the PokerStars Caribbean Adventure in 2011, Katchalov bested 37 other players in the $100,000 Super High Roller tournament, defeating Team Pokerstars Pro Daniel Negreanu heads-up, to win $1.5million. Ten days later, he came in 2nd place in the PCA $10,000 High Roller - 6 Max event winning $131,920 .

In June 2007, Katchalov won the Bellagio Cup III's $5,000 No-Limit Hold'em event.

As of May 2017, his total live tournament winnings exceed $8,900,000.

World Series of Poker 
In 2011 Katchalov conquered the prestigious bracelet in the $1,500 Seven-Card Stud event.

World Series of Poker Europe (WSOPE)

World Poker Tour 
Eugene Katchalov is active in the WPT field since 2004, a milestone reserved to few still active professional poker players.

European Poker Tour 
The European Poker Tour (EPT) was one of the biggest itinerant tournament series hosted by PokerStars.
EPT had its final season in 2016 when the PokerStars Championship succeeded.

PokerStars Championship

PokerStars Festival

Card Player Poker Tour

eSports 
Katchalov is a well-known sport enthusiast and in winter 2016 he joined long term friend and former PokerStars colleague Luca Pagano in the eSport adventure. He is co-owner of one of the first Italian professional competitive esport team: QLASH.

Notes

External links
Eugene Katchalov Interview
CardPlayer.com article - Eugene Katchalov Wins 2007 Doyle Brunson Classic
World Poker Tour profile

1981 births
American poker players
World Poker Tour winners
World Series of Poker bracelet winners
Living people